WZZU (97.9 MHz) is a commercial FM radio station licensed to Lynchburg, Virginia.  It broadcasts a mainstream rock format and is owned and operated by Mel Wheeler, Inc.  The studios and offices are on Electric Road SW in Roanoke, Virginia.

WZZU has an effective radiated power (ERP) of 570 watts.  The transmitter is on Mistover Drive in Monroe, Virginia.  Programming is also heard in the Roanoke metropolitan area on FM translator W247AD at 97.3 MHz.

History
Its original call sign was WLLL-FM, broadcasting at 98.3 MHz. It was the FM sister station to WLLL 930 AM. The two stations were owned by the Griffith Broadcasting Corporation. At first, WLLL-FM simulcast WLLL. Later, it had an automated oldies format, with its WGOL call letters standing for GOLden Oldies. In 1997, the call sign switched to WRVX.

In 2000, it changed its call sign to WZZU, airing a classic rock format.  On April 19, 2021, WZZU segued from classic rock to mainstream rock, branded as "The Rock Channel".

Previous logo

References

External links
97.3 & 97.9 The Rock Channel Online

ZZU
Radio stations established in 1970
1970 establishments in Virginia
Mainstream rock radio stations in the United States